John Hollenbeck is an American jazz drummer and composer known for his work with The Claudia Quintet and Bob Brookmeyer.

Early life and education
Hollenbeck was born in Binghamton, New York. He earned degrees in percussion and jazz composition from the Eastman School of Music

Career 
Hollenbeck moved to New York City in the early-1990s. He has worked with Bob Brookmeyer, Fred Hersch, Tony Malaby, the Village Vanguard Orchestra, Kenny Wheeler, Pablo Ziegler, and Meredith Monk.

In 1998, he composed The Shape of Spirit, a piece for wind ensemble on Mons Records, and in 1999 composed Processional and Desiderata for wind ensemble and orator. This composition, written for and featuring the voice and trombone of Bob Brookmeyer, was released on Challenge Records in 2001. The Cloud of Unknowing, commissioned by the Bamberg Choir in Germany was released in 2001 on the Edel Classics label with works by J. S. Bach, Igor Stravinsky, and Paul Hindemith.

In 2002, his IAJE Gil Evans Fellowship Commission piece, A Blessing, featuring vocalist Theo Bleckmann, was performed to critical acclaim at the IAJE Conference; and in 2003 his IAJE/ASCAP Commission, Folkmoot, was premiered in Toronto, Canada. In addition, he composed and performed the percussion score to the following Meredith Monk works: Magic Frequencies; Mercy (ECM, 2002); and The Impermanence Project (ECM, 2008).

Hollenbeck's chamber piece, Demütig Bitten, was commissioned by the Windsbacher Knabenchor (Germany) and released in 2004 on the Rondeau label with works by Giovanni Gabrieli, Josquin des Prez, and Johann Sebastian Bach. His commission through Bang on a Can and the People's Commissioning Fund was performed by the Bang on a Can All-Stars at Merkin Concert Hall in New York City in February 2006. His commissions, funded by the Jerome Foundation and Youngstown State University, were premiered at the Whitney Museum in October 2007.

Hollenbeck's recording career as a leader began in the winter of 2001 with: no images, which Gary Giddins included in his Village Voice 2001 top ten list, Quartet Lucy, and the Claudia Quintet. His second Claudia Quintet recording, I, Claudia, appeared on Cuneiform in 2004, followed by Semi-Formal in 2005.

His second large ensemble recording, Joys and Desires, featuring Jazz Big Band Graz and Theo Bleckmann, was released by Intuition in 2006 to critical acclaim. The Claudia Quintet received four-star reviews from DownBeat and The Guardian for its fourth recording, For (Cuneiform, 2007), and was named "Rising Star Acoustic Jazz Group" in DownBeat's 2008 Critics Poll.

Hollenbeck was a professor of jazz drums and improvisation at the Jazz Institute Berlin from 2005 to 2016.

In 2015, he joined the faculty of Schulich School of Music.

Discography

As leader
 Static Still with Theo Bleckmann (GPE, 2000)
 John Hollenbeck/Claudia Quintet (CRI, 2001)
 No Images (CRI, 2001)
 Quartet Lucy (CRI, 2002)
 Joys & Desires (Intuition, 2005)
 Rainbow Jimmies (GPE, 2008)
 Songs We Like a Lot (Sunnyside, 2015)
  All Can Work (2018)

As guest
With Bob Brookmeyer and Kenny Wheeler
Island (Artists House, 2003)
With Samo Salamon and Julian Arguelles
 Unity (Samo Records, 2016)

References

External links
 John Hollenbeck's website
The Claudia Quintet's website

Avant-garde jazz musicians
American jazz drummers
Musicians from New York City
American jazz composers
American male jazz composers
1968 births
Living people
20th-century American drummers
American male drummers
Jazz musicians from New York (state)
20th-century American male musicians
Academic staff of the Hochschule für Musik Hanns Eisler Berlin